is a soccer game for the Nintendo 64. It was released exclusively in Japan in 1997 and licensed by J-League. The players have a cartoon appearance as opposed to other Japanese soccer games at the time, such as J-League Dynamite Soccer 64.

See also
List of J. League licensed video games

1997 video games
Hudson Soft games
J.League licensed video games
Japan-exclusive video games
Nintendo 64 games
Nintendo 64-only games
Video games developed in Japan